Georgi Damyanovo Municipality is a frontier municipality (obshtina) in Montana Province, Northwestern Bulgaria, located on the northern slopes of western Stara Planina mountain and the area of the so-called Fore-Balkan. It is named after its administrative centre - the village of Georgi Damyanovo. In the southwest, the municipality borders on Republic of Serbia.

Settlements 

Georgi Damyanovo Municipality includes the following 13 places all of them villages:

Demography 
The following table shows the change of the population during the last four decades.

Religion 
According to the latest Bulgarian census of 2011, the religious composition, among those who answered the optional question on religious identification, was the following:

See also
Provinces of Bulgaria
Municipalities of Bulgaria
List of cities and towns in Bulgaria

References

External links
 Official website 

Municipalities in Montana Province